
The following lists events that happened during 1854 in South Africa.

Events
 23 February - The Orange Free State Republic is established with the signing of the Bloemfontein Convention
 15 October - U.G. Lauts appointed consul of the Orange Free State in the Netherlands 
 The Cape Colony elects its first parliament
 Sir George Grey, Portuguese-born British, is appointed Governor of the Cape
 The Boers defeat the Ndebele at Makapansgat

References
See Years in South Africa for list of References

Years in South Africa